Stottlemyre is an Americanized form of the German name Stadelmayer (also Stadelmaier, Stadelmeyer, and Stadelmeier), a name that originated as an occupational title. In medieval Germany, a Stadelmayer or Stadelmeyer was a man who managed the warehouse of a wholesale merchant.

Description
Stottlemyre has several variant spellings, including (most commonly) "Stottlemyer" and "Stottlemeyer." Another recent variant, which stems from the American pronunciation is "Stoudemire."

Notable Stottlemyres

Business
L. Brent Stottlemyre, Vice President, Peabody Energy.

Politics
Richard Stottlemyer, former mayor (1992–2010) of Penbrook, Pennsylvania
Roger Stottlemyre, Executive Director of Enforcement, Missouri Gaming Commission
Todd A. Stottlemyre, fifth president of the National Federation of Independent Business

Sports
Mel Stottlemyre, American baseball player
Mel Stottlemyre Jr., American baseball player
Todd Stottlemyre, American baseball player
Rande Stottlemyer, University of Pittsburgh Panthers wrestling head coach

Fictional Characters
 Captain Leland Stottlemeyer, fictional police officer played by Ted Levine from the USA Network television series Monk
 Karen Stottlemeyer, fictional environmentalist ex-wife of Leland Stottlemeyer

References